The James Brown Show (also known as Presenting the James Brown Show) is a 1967 album featuring James Brown. It was released on Smash Records and showcases the vocalists who performed with the James Brown Revue in the mid-1960s, including Famous Flame "Baby Lloyd" Stallworth, Vicki Anderson, The Jewels, and James Crawford. Following the terms of Brown's contract with King Records, he does not sing on the album, but contributes as producer, arranger, and organist. 

Although The James Brown Show presents itself as a live album, parts of it were recorded in the studio. It has never been released on CD.

Track listing

References

James Brown albums
1967 live albums
albums produced by James Brown